Toba Khedoori (born 1964 in Australia) is an artist of Iraqi heritage, known primarily for highly detailed mixed-media paintings executed on large sheets of wax-coated paper.

Biography
Khedoori was born in Sydney of Jewish-Iraqi parentage and raised in Australia, and currently lives and works in Los Angeles, California. She received her MFA from UCLA in 1994. She is the identical twin sister of artist Rachel Khedoori.

Artwork
Characteristically, Khedoori's works have comprised intricate details, models or architectural renderings set within the broad expanses of waxed paper or linen. This delicate combination frequently necessitates close viewing which results, then, in the works filling the spectator's entire field of vision. In recent years, Khedoori's works have introduced inversions of the more usual black detail on white expanse, incorporated natural imagery and landscape, and also taken the form of dramatically smaller-scale works than those hitherto produced. Her most recent output has also moved from wax-on-paper into oil and canvas, with subject matter drawing influence from geometric sequences.

Toba Khedoori is represented by Regen Projects, Los Angeles and David Zwirner, New York.

Exhibitions
Khedoori began exhibiting in 1993, and was shown early in her career at the 1995 Whitney Biennial exhibition. Khedoori has since had solo exhibitions at the Museum of Contemporary Art, Los Angeles, in the St. Louis Art Museum, the Whitechapel Art Gallery in London, the Walker Art Center in Minneapolis, and the Hirshhorn Museum in Washington D.C., among others. Khedoori's work is in the permanent collections of the Museum of Modern Art and the Whitney Museum of Art in New York, as well as the Museum of Contemporary Art, Los Angeles and the Los Angeles County Museum of Art.

Awards
Khedoori was awarded a $500,000 MacArthur Fellowship in 2002.

Art market 
Khedoori is represented by Regen Projects, Los Angeles and David Zwirner, New York.

See also
 Iraqi art
 Islamic art
 List of Iraqi artists
 List of Iraqi women artists

References

External links
Toba Khedoori - Regen Projects
Toba Khedoori solo exhibition 1997 Walker Art Center, Minneapolis
"Immense Miniatures" by Jerry Saltz The Village Voice

Living people
MacArthur Fellows
Painters from California
Iraqi painters
Identical twins
Artists from Sydney
Australian emigrants to the United States
American people of Iraqi-Jewish descent
1964 births
Jewish American artists
American women painters
Australian twins
Iraqi women artists
Australian women artists
Iraqi contemporary artists
Australian people of Iraqi-Jewish descent
20th-century American women artists
University of California, Los Angeles alumni
Iraqi Jews
21st-century American women artists
21st-century American Jews